Halanaerobacter lacunaris is a Gram-negative and polyextremophile bacterium from the genus of Halanaerobacter.

References

Clostridia
Bacteria described in 1992